Bruce Price Cottage is one of four "cottages" constructed by Bruce Price on Pepperidge Road in Tuxedo Park, New York. Price was the founding architect of the Tuxedo Park estate, where he designed and built a number of the large mansions. Bruce Price Cottage and other constructions in Tuxedo Park were highly influential on the style of Frank Lloyd Wright and other, younger architects.

He constructed the cottage for his wife, Josephine Lee, in 1897. He also constructed Emily Post cottage for their daughter who spent her childhood there. Regular visitors to the house at the time included Pierre Lorillard and William Astor.

Bruce Price Cottage is built in Dutch Colonial Revival style. All four cottages were inherited by Emily. In 1920 she divided the property.

Notable people who have lived in the Bruce Price Cottages include Edwin and Emily Post, Guy and Lory Spier, and Robb Norden.

References

External links
Hudson River Valley Heritage Building Structure Inventory Form

National Register of Historic Places in Orange County, New York
Houses in Orange County, New York
Dutch Colonial Revival architecture in the United States
Houses completed in 1897
Houses on the National Register of Historic Places in New York (state)
Shingle Style architecture in New York (state)
Historic district contributing properties in New York (state)
Bruce Price buildings